The 2008 Colorado Democratic presidential caucuses took place on Super Tuesday, February 5, 2008. As he did in every other state that held a caucus rather than a primary, Barack Obama won the caucus by a wide, two-to-one margin over Hillary Clinton.

Process
As a cost-saving measure, Colorado stopped holding primary elections in 2000 in favor of a caucus system. Caucuses are run and paid for by the political parties. Both Republican and Democratic Caucus started at 7 p.m.

The Colorado Democratic Caucus was a closed caucus, open only to registered voters who registered as Democrats no later than December 5, 2007, with the exception of 18-year-olds or new citizens, who could register at the caucus site. The precinct chairs took presidential preference polls of all caucus attendees; these preference polls were reported to the media. After the preference poll, delegates were then selected among the attendees for each viable candidate, and supporters of nonviable groups could re-caucus into viable groups. Candidates were required to reach a 15-percent threshold for viability within each level of the selection process.

Following the local caucuses, county conventions, congressional district conventions, and the state convention, on May 17, 2008, were held to finally apportion delegates to the Democratic National Convention.

Polls
A Denver Post poll from late January indicated that Barack Obama was leading Hillary Clinton, though polls from earlier in the year had showed Clinton with a double-digit lead.

Results

Precinct Caucus Results 
Total Precincts: 3,205

Caucus date: February 5, 2008

County Assembly and Convention Results

Assembly/Convention Dates: February 20–March 17, 2008

National pledged delegates determined: 0 (of 55)

Congressional District Convention Results

Convention Dates: May 3–16, 2008

National pledged delegates determined: 36 (of 55)

State Convention Results

Convention Date: May 17, 2008

National pledged delegates determined: 19 (of 55)

Analysis
Barack Obama's large margin of victory in the Colorado Democratic Caucus can be traced to a number of factors. The Clinton campaign largely ignored organizing for caucuses and rather spent their time getting the vote out in bigger, more crucial states that had more delegates up for grabs. The Obama campaign took advantage of this and it ultimately paid off as caucusgoers in Colorado awarded Obama a more than two-to-one margin of victory. Obama performed extremely well statewide and won nearly every county. Clinton performed the best in Eastern Colorado where she won the more rural and conservative counties in the Eastern Slope.

See also
 2008 Colorado Republican Caucus
 2008 Democratic Party presidential primaries

References

Colorado
2008 Colorado elections
2008
2008 Super Tuesday